Marvin Schulz (born 15 January 1995) is a German professional footballer who plays as a centre-back for  club Holstein Kiel.

Club career 
Schulz made his first team debut at 10 August 2015 in the DFB-Pokal against FC St. Pauli in a 4–1 away win. Five days later he made his Bundesliga debut in a 4–0 loss against Borussia Dortmund.

In July 2017, Schulz joined Swiss Super League side FC Luzern signing a three-year deal until 2020.

On 30 May 2022, it was announced that Schulz had signed for Holstein Kiel of the 2. Bundesliga on a three-year contract.

International career
Schulz was a youth international for Germany at the U20 level.

References

External links
 
 

1995 births
Living people
German footballers
Association football defenders
Germany youth international footballers
Bundesliga players
Regionalliga players
Swiss Super League players
Borussia Mönchengladbach II players
Borussia Mönchengladbach players
FC Luzern players
Holstein Kiel players
German expatriate footballers
German expatriate sportspeople in Switzerland
Expatriate footballers in Switzerland
Sportspeople from Mülheim
Footballers from North Rhine-Westphalia